Rose Hill Farm is a historic home and farm located near Winchester, Frederick County, Virginia. It is a vernacular Federal style, -story brick and stucco structure built about 1819. The earliest section was built about 1797, and began as a three-room-plan, -story, log structure built upon a limestone foundation. About 1850,  the house was enhanced with vernacular Greek Revival-style elements. Also on the property are a contributing summer kitchen (c. 1862), cistern (date unknown), corn crib (date unknown), and barn (c.1850–1860).

It was listed on the National Register of Historic Places in 1997.

References

External links
 

Houses on the National Register of Historic Places in Virginia
Farms on the National Register of Historic Places in Virginia
Federal architecture in Virginia
Greek Revival houses in Virginia
Houses completed in 1797
Houses in Frederick County, Virginia
National Register of Historic Places in Frederick County, Virginia
1797 establishments in Virginia